Mobile testing may refer to:
 Mobile-device testing
 Mobile application testing